Les Useres (known in Spanish as Useras is a municipality in the comarca of Alcalatén in the Valencian Community, Spain. In August 2007, 120 residents had to be evacuated as a result of a forest fire.

References

Municipalities in the Province of Castellón
Maestrazgo